Ioannis Karyofyllis (born 1908, date of death unknown) was a Greek athlete. He competed in the men's high jump at the 1928 Summer Olympics.

References

1908 births
Year of death missing
Athletes (track and field) at the 1928 Summer Olympics
Greek male high jumpers
Olympic athletes of Greece
Place of birth missing
Athletes from Athens